The Midnight Message is a 1926 silent film drama produced and released by an independent producer. It was directed by Paul Hurst and starred Wanda Hawley and Mary Carr. A surviving film today at the Library of Congress, it is available on home video and DVD.

Cast
Wanda Hawley - Mary Macy
Mary Carr - Widow Malone
Johnny Fox - The Boy (*as John Fox Jr.)
Stuart Holmes - 'Red' Fagan
Creighton Hale - Billy Dodd
Mathilde Brundage - Mrs. Richard Macy(*as Mathilda Brundage)
Otis Harlan - Richard Macy
Earl Metcalfe - Burl
Karl Silvera - Thin
Wilson Benge - Butler

References

External links
The Midnight Message at IMDb.com
allmovie/synopsis

1926 films
American silent feature films
1926 drama films
Silent American drama films
American black-and-white films
1920s American films